

Gmina Miedzna is a rural gmina (administrative district) in Węgrów County, Masovian Voivodeship, in east-central Poland.

Villages
Gmina Miedzna contains the villages and settlements of Glina, Miedzna, Międzyleś, Orzeszówka, Poszewka, Rostki, Tchórzowa, Ugoszcz, Warchoły, Wola Orzeszowska, Wrotnów, Wrzoski, Żeleźniki and Zuzułka.

Neighbouring gminas
Gmina Miedzna is bordered by the town of Węgrów and by the gminas of Kosów Lacki, Liw, Sokołów Podlaski and Stoczek.

References

Polish official population figures 2006

Miedzna
Węgrów County